Joseph Weldon Bailey Jr. (December 15, 1892 – July 17, 1943) was a member of the United States House of Representatives from Texas.  His father, Joseph Weldon Bailey, was a member of both houses of the United States Congress.

Biography
Bailey was born in Gainesville, Texas. He attended public schools in Gainesville and then Washington, D.C.  He graduated in 1915 from Princeton University and from the University of Virginia School of Law in 1919. He served in the United States Army from 1917 to 1919 during World War I and achieved the rank of first lieutenant as a member of the 314th Field Artillery regiment, a unit of the 80th Division. He was a lawyer, and maintained a private practice

Bailey was elected as a Democrat to the Seventy-third Congress, having served from March 4, 1933 to January 3, 1935. He was not a candidate for renomination in 1934, but was an unsuccessful candidate for the Democratic nomination for the United States Senate, a position that his father had held from 1901 to 1913. He lost in a landslide to  Tom Connally.

In 1942, following the outbreak of World War II, Bailey received a commission as a captain in the United States Marine Corps. He died at Camp Howze in Gainesville in 1943 shortly after a car accident. He was originally buried in Fairview Cemetery in Gainesville with his father, but he was moved to Hillcrest Cemetery in Dallas in 1958 at the request of his widow.

See also

References

External links

1892 births
1943 deaths
United States Army officers
United States Marine Corps officers
United States Army personnel of World War I
United States Marine Corps personnel of World War II
Princeton University alumni
University of Virginia School of Law alumni
Texas lawyers
Democratic Party members of the United States House of Representatives from Texas
20th-century American politicians
20th-century American lawyers